Cesvaine Parish is an administrative unit of Madona Municipality, Latvia. It was created in 2010 from the countryside territory of Cesvaine town. At the beginning of 2014, the population of the parish was 1356.

Towns, villages and settlements of Cesvaine parish 
 Graši
 Kārkli
 Kārzdaba
 Kraukļi

References 

Parishes of Latvia
Madona Municipality
Vidzeme